USS Ozette has been the name of more than United States Navy ship, and may refer to:

 , a cargo ship launched in 1918 but never commissioned
 , later YTM-541, a tug commissioned in 1945 and disposed of by transfer in 1974

United States Navy ship names